Hogsthorpe is a small village in the East Lindsey district of Lincolnshire, England. Through Hogsthorpe runs the A52, the main road connecting the village to the nearby resorts of Skegness, Mablethorpe and Ingoldmells.

The parish includes the hamlets of Slackholme and Authorpe Row.

Hogsthorpe contains a church, a restaurant, two public houses, a small primary school and a village hall.

History
Hogsthorpe's church, dedicated to Saint Mary, is built in Early English style of limestone and greenstone, and is a Grade I Listed Building. It dates from the 12th century, and has a 12th-century tower, a 15th-century font and a pulpit from 1730. The chancel was rebuilt in 1870, and the church was restored in 1853 and 1910. 

In 1885 Kelly's reported a Wesleyan and a Primitive Methodist chapel, corn mills and brickfields. Chief landowners included Baroness Willoughby de Eresby and Lord of the Manor Lieutenant Colonel Sir Nelson Rycroft bart of Kempshott Park. The parish had an area of  supporting the production of wheat, beans and oats, and an 1881 population of 719.

The Wesleyan chapel was built in 1863, but closed in 1994 and was converted into flats in 1997.

The Saracens Head is a Grade II listed early 18th-century public house.

Built as a National School in 1857, Hogsthorpe school was the Hogsthorpe County Primary School between 1947 and 1999, and is now the Hogsthorpe Community Primary School.

The village was the birthplace of politician Christopher Addison, 1st Viscount Addison.

Population

Geography

References

External links 

Hogsthorpe Parish Council (official site)
Hogsthorpe's independent village website (2007)

Villages in Lincolnshire
Civil parishes in Lincolnshire
East Lindsey District